The Star of Indiana Drum and Bugle Corps is a defunct competitive junior drum and bugle corps, based in Bloomington, Indiana. The corps was the 1991 Drum Corps International (DCI) World Champion.

History

The DCI years
The Star of Indiana Drum and Bugle Corps was founded in 1984 in Bloomington, Indiana. Its startup was funded with a grant of $1,000,000 from Bill Cook and his medical device manufacturing company, the Cook Group. Marching a then-maximum one hundred twenty-eight members under the directorship of Jim Mason, at the 1985 DCI World Championships in Madison, Wisconsin, Star of Indiana became only the second corps to earn a spot among DCI's Top Twelve Finalists in its first season of competition; the first corps to do so was the 1972 Bleu Raeders. Star of Indiana marched in DCI competition for only nine seasons, but finished in DCI Finals every year, twice finishing third, second once, and winning the 1991 DCI Open Class World Championship. In addition to its DCI title, Star also won the Drum Corps Midwest Division I Championship, 1991–93; the U.S. Open in 1988 & '89; the DCI Preview of Champions title, 1991–93; and ten DCI Regional Championships, 1988-93.

Brass Theater
As early as 1992, Star's staff knew that they wanted the corps to do more than perform a thirteen-minute drum corps competition program. After the 1993 season, Star of Indiana departed the competition field and developed a new way of presenting drum corps. "Brass Theater" was designed to apply the powerful brass and percussion and the exacting choreography of drum corps to pop, Broadway, movie, and classical music to create an all-new type of stage entertainment. Touring with the Canadian Brass, the world's most popular brass quintet, "Brass Theater" was a hit with fans and critics alike on a ten-city tour in 1994. Star and the Canadian Brass toured again in 1995 and '96 as "Brass Theater II" and "... III" to even greater acclaim. The two groups also recorded three CDs of the "Brass Theater" programs. Then, in 1997 and '98, Star settled down to perform "Brass Theater" at the Grand Palace Theatre in Branson, Missouri.

Blast!
In 1999, Star premiered the stage show Blast! at the Hammersmith Theatre in London, England. After an unimpressive start, its audience steadily grew, until it became a top ten hit on the London stage. After a year in London, "Blast! returned to the U.S. in 2000, debuting on the Broadway stage to rave reviews. The show won the 2001 Tony Award for Best Special Theatrical Event, and, when it was videotaped for PBS, it won the 2001 Emmy Award for Best Choreography. After its Broadway run, Star took Blast! on the road, with companies touring the country each year to large and enthusiastic audiences. Casts were also developed to perform long-term engagements at Disneyland in Anaheim, California and at Disney World in Orlando, Florida. Blast! continued to tour through 2012.

Alumni corps
In August 2010, Star of Indiana returned to the DCI World Championships. The alumni had previously gathered to perform, but on August 11, the Star of Indiana Alumni Corps performed after the last competing corps in DCI's semifinals at Lucas Oil Stadium in Indianapolis.

One group of Star of Indiana alumni formed Star United, a mini-corps that competes at the Drum Corps Associates (DCA) senior drum and bugle corps championships. Star United won the DCA mini-corps championship 2006-2012, 2014–2018, and 2022, and scored a perfect 100.00 in the 2011 Finals. Star United also performed as a SoundSport team at the 2014 and 2017 DCI World Championships in Indianapolis.

Show summary (1985–1993) 
Sources:

Caption awards
At the annual World Championship Finals, Drum Corps International (DCI) presents awards to the corps with the high average scores from prelims, semifinals, and finals in five captions. Prior to 2000 and the adoption of the current scoring format, Star of Indiana won these captions:

High General Effect Award
1991 (tie)

High Brass Performance Award
1990, 1991 (tie), 1992, 1993 (tie)

High Percussion Performance Award
1991 (tie), 1993

References

External links 
Alumni website

Drum Corps International defunct corps
Musical groups from Indiana
Monroe County, Indiana
Musical groups established in 1984
1984 establishments in Indiana
Drum Corps Associates corps